Sissy Löwinger (22 June 1941 – 25 September 2011) was an Austrian actress, director and theatre manager. She was the daughter of Austrian actors Liesl and Paul Löwinger. She worked in public relations and dramaturgy for the family theatre "Löwinger Bühne" together with her brother, Paul. Later she also directed plays. After her father's death she became manager of the theatre, again with her brother Paul. She directed and edited television comedies and also wrote eight plays.  She appeared in the role of Walpurga in the Franz Josef Gottlieb directed German production of Saison in Salzburg (1961).

She was married to the very popular Austrian television presenter Peter Rapp, and later to Peter Blechinger, with whom she lived in a house in Neulengbach in Austria. Löwinger had a daughter from her first marriage.

Löwinger died on 25 September 2011 in Altlengbach, Lower Austria as a consequence of pulmonary embolism.  She was 70.

Director 
 1983: Ein Mann für zwei Frauen
 1985: Der keusche Joseph

Selected filmography
 Season in Salzburg (1951)
 Don't Fool with Me (1963)
 Das ist mein Wien (1965)
 Our Doctor is the Best (1969)
 Always Trouble with the Teachers (1968)
  ( Wild, Willing & Sexy, 1969)
 House of Pleasure (1969)
  ( Sex Is a Pleasure, 1969)
 Frau Wirtin treibt es jetzt noch toller (The Hostess Exceeds All Bounds, 1970)
 No Sin on the Alpine Pastures (1974)

References

External links 
 
 Newspaper Lower Austria
 Website City of Vienna
 www.aeiou.at

1941 births
2011 deaths
Austrian film actresses
Austrian television actresses
20th-century Austrian actresses